U.S. Bank Tower, known locally as the Library Tower and formerly as the First Interstate Bank World Center, is a  skyscraper  in downtown Los Angeles, California. It is, by structural height, the third-tallest building in California, the second-tallest building in Los Angeles, the 24th-tallest in the United States, the third-tallest west of the Mississippi River after the Salesforce Tower and the Wilshire Grand Center, and the 129th-tallest building in the world, after being surpassed by the Wilshire Grand Center. However, the U.S. Bank Tower does surpass both the Salesforce Tower and the Wilshire Grand Center in roof height, making it the only building in California whose roof height exceeds . Because local building codes required all high-rise buildings to have a helipad, it was known as the tallest building in the world with a rooftop heliport from its completion in 1989 to 2010 when the China World Trade Center Tower III opened. It is also the third-tallest building in a major active seismic region; its structure was designed to resist an earthquake of 8.3 on the Richter scale. It consists of 73 stories above ground and two parking levels below ground. Construction began in 1987 with completion in 1989. The building was designed by Henry N. Cobb of the architectural firm Pei Cobb Freed & Partners and cost $350 million to build. It is one of the most recognizable buildings in Los Angeles, and often appears in establishing shots for the city in films and television programs.

Ownership
U.S. Bank Tower in Los Angeles was sold to OUE Ltd (OUE), a diversified real estate owner, developer and operator group, in 2013. OUE, a Singapore-listed company run by Indonesian billionaire Stephen Riady, acquired the tower and other related assets for $367.5 million. OUE acquired the 72-floor office building, the adjacent Maguire Gardens park, and a parking lot from a unit of Los Angeles-based real-estate investment trust MPG Office Trust Inc.

On July 20, 2020, it was announced that Larry Silverstein (Silverstein Properties), the developer of the World Trade Center, purchased the building for reportedly 430 million dollars. The deal closed in late September.

History
The building was first known and is alternatively known today as the Library Tower, because it was built as part of the $1 billion Los Angeles Central Library redevelopment area, following two disastrous fires at the library in 1986, and its location across the street. The City of Los Angeles sold air rights to the developers of the tower to help pay for the reconstruction of the library. The building was also known for a time as First Interstate Bank World Center but the name Library Tower was restored after First Interstate Bancorp merged with Wells Fargo Bank. In March 2003, the property was leased by U.S. Bancorp and the building was renamed the U.S. Bank Tower.

The tower has a large glass crown at its top that is illuminated at night. On February 28, 2004, two  “U.S. Bank” logo signs were installed on the crown, amid controversy for their effect on the aesthetic appearance of the building, much like the previous First Interstate Bank logos were placed on the crown between 1990 and 1998.

Terrorist target
On June 16, 2004, the 9/11 Commission reported that the original plan for the September 11 attacks called for the hijacking of ten planes, one of which was to be crashed into the building.

On October 6, 2005, House officials stated that the government had foiled a previously undisclosed second plot to crash a plane into the building in mid-2002. In his televised 2006 State of the Union Address, President George W. Bush asserted that American counterterrorism officials foiled a plot to fly planes into the tower. According to President Bush, Al-Qaeda leader Khaled Sheikh Mohammed's plan was to use Asian confederates from Jemaah Islamiyah recruited by Islamic militant Hambali for the hijacking. President Bush asserted the hijackers were going to use shoe bombs to breach the plane's cockpit door. Some counter-terrorism experts have expressed doubt that the plot was ever fully developed or likely to occur.

OUE Skyspace

In July 2014, OUE Ltd. (OUE), the new owners of the skyscraper, announced construction of an observation deck named OUE Skyspace. on the 69th and 70th floors and a restaurant named 71Above on the 71st floor. The facilities opened on June 24, 2016, following remodeling and construction costing $31 million that included a makeover of the ground floor lobby as well as a separate second floor entrance for tourists, and a skylobby and exhibit hall on the 54th floor. Access to the observation deck cost $25 per person.  For an additional $8, visitors could take a trip down a transparent glass slide affixed to the outside of the building between the 70th and 69th floors known as the Skyslide.

OUE Skyspace closed temporarily due to the COVID-19 pandemic in March 2020. On October 26, 2020, it was announced that the closure was permanent. In May 2021, it was announced that a renovation by the new owner of the tower would result in the conversion of the observation deck attraction back to office space and the removal of the slide, due to complaints from office tenants.

Silverstein Properties
With the building 78% leased, New York developer Silverstein Properties announced plans in 2021 to make changes to the building to attract tenants. The tourist attraction will be converted to office space or communal areas. The 71Above restaurant will remain open while the 54th floor, where people going higher must change elevators, will be turned into a co-working lounge with workstations, food and beverage options and a catering kitchen for events.

Major tenants
 Lewis Brisbois Bisgaard & Smith
 Akin Gump Strauss Hauer & Feld
 Cornerstone Research
 Gordon & Rees LLP
 Hinshaw & Culbertson LLP
 Perkins Coie
 Jenner & Block
 Thomson West
 U.S. Bancorp
 White & Case
 Littler Mendelson
 Pizzaply Media

Tallest rooftop helipad
The US Bank Tower was the world's tallest building with a rooftop helipad until the China World Trade Center Tower III in Beijing, which was completed in 2010 and whose rooftop helipad is 1,083 feet (330 m) high.

As of March 2018, the world's tallest building with a rooftop helipad was the Guangzhou International Finance Center, which also was completed in 2010 and whose rooftop helipad is 1,439 feet (439 m) high.

Gallery

See also

 50 tallest buildings in the U.S.
 List of tallest buildings in Los Angeles
 List of tallest buildings by U.S. state
 List of tallest freestanding structures in the world
 List of tallest freestanding steel structures

References

External links

 U.S. Bank Tower website 
 71 Above restaurant website
 Building Profile on Emporis
 List of Tenants @ U.S. Bank Tower - Companies located at 633 W 5th Street, Los Angeles, CA

Bank buildings in California
Buildings and structures in Downtown Los Angeles
Bunker Hill, Los Angeles
Skyscraper office buildings in Los Angeles
U.S. Bank buildings
Office buildings completed in 1989
1989 establishments in California
1980s architecture in the United States